The Parallax: Hypersleep Dialogues is an extended play by American progressive metal band Between the Buried and Me. It was released on April 12, 2011 and was the group's first release through Metal Blade Records after leaving Victory Records in 2010. The entire EP was made available for streaming two weeks before its release on March 31, 2011.

The Parallax: Hypersleep Dialogues is the first release in a two-part concept album suite. The second half, The Parallax II: Future Sequence is a full-length album that was released on October 9, 2012. Between the Buried and Me made the conscious decision to precede a studio album with an extended play for several reasons, particularly to release a first album on Metal Blade fairly quickly. In addition to being part of a concept album series, frontman Tommy Giles Rogers also listed wanting to keep the group's name "out there" and seeking new material to perform at concerts in an interview with MetalSucks.

In support of the release, Between the Buried and Me toured North America with Job for a Cowboy, The Ocean and Cephalic Carnage during April through May 2011. During this tour, the group performed the entire EP, along with several tracks from previous albums, live at all concert dates.

Concept and story line

The Parallax: Hypersleep Dialogues is written from the perspective of the characters Prospect 1 and Prospect 2. Prospect 1 is a seemingly normal citizen, whereas Prospect 2 is a space pilot tasked with planting human souls on a new planet.

The first track, "Specular Reflection", opens with Prospect 1 after the events of "Swim to the Moon" (The Great Misdirect). Prospect 1 wakes up on an island after attempting suicide by drowning. While on the island, he begins having dreams about seeing someone that looks exactly like him. Meanwhile, Prospect 2 begins having dreams about being on an island while flying towards the new planet.

In the second track, "Augment of Rebirth", Prospect 2 begins to develop a god complex as he arrives at the new planet and fulfills his mission. At the same time, Prospect 1 signals a passing boat to take him back to civilization.

In the final track, "Lunar Wilderness", Prospect 1 returns home only to find his it has somehow vanished without a trace. Prospect 2 flies back to his home planet, discovering it has also disappeared.

Reception

Critical reception

The Parallax: Hypersleep Dialogues received generally favorable reviews. Jason Lymangrover of Allmusic praised David Bottrill's production stating that it "is perfectly suited, and only enhances the band's ever-intensifying talents," and that the EP itself is "a short one, but even with a 30-minute running time, the EP cobbles together enough intricate twists and turns that it feels massive, and each of the three songs is an epic journey in precision." Adrien Begrand of PopMatters noted that, "there's nothing at all new [that Between the Buried and Me is] doing here, but what matters most is just how fresh they can make this new material sound, predictable as it all may feel."

Jeff Treppel of Decibel said that the concept of the EP was difficult to follow, commenting that "if they want you to care about what's going on, they fail."

Charts and sales
In its first week of release, The Parallax: Hypersleep Dialogues sold around 10,000 units and debuted on the US Billboard 200 chart at number 54. On other Billboard charts, the album ranked at number 16 on Rock Albums, number 8 on Independent Albums, number 5 on Hard Rock Albums and number 13 on Tastemaker albums.

Track listing

Personnel
The Parallax: Hypersleep Dialogues as adapted from the CD liner notes.

Between the Buried and Me
 Dan Briggs – bass guitar, keyboards, backing vocals
 Blake Richardson – drums, percussion
 Tommy Giles Rogers – vocals, keyboards
 Paul Waggoner – guitars, vocals
 Dustie Waring – guitars

Production
 David Bottrill – engineering, production
 Mat Klucznyk – assistant engineer
 Jamie King – mixing, mastering, additional production
 Between the Buried and Me – production
 Sons of Nero – artwork, layout

Charts

References

2011 EPs
Between the Buried and Me albums
Metal Blade Records EPs
Albums produced by David Bottrill
Albums with cover art by Sons of Nero
Science fiction concept albums